Serhiy Zgura is a retired Ukrainian footballer who played as a midfielder.

Career
In 1993 he began his career in the second team of Chornomorets-2 Odesa, and in 1995 he moved to Kremenchug "Neftekhimik". Then he played for Dynamo-Smena (Yuzhny), Desna Chernihiv and Zimbru Chișinău. In the club of Moldova he won the Moldovan National Division in 1997–98, 1998–99 and 1999–2000. In summer 2000 he returned to Chornomorets Odesa for half a season where he played 14 matches. and then defended the colors of Metalurh Donetsk. In 2004 he returned to Chornomorets Odesa. Upon completion of the contract at the end of 2005.

Honours
Zimbru Chișinău
 Moldovan National Division: (3) 1997–98, 1998–99, 1999–2000
 Moldovan Cup: 1997–98

Desna Chernihiv
 Ukrainian Second League: 1996–97

References

External links 
 Serhiy Zgura footballfacts.ru
 Serhiy Zgura allplayers.in.ua

1977 births
Living people
FC Desna Chernihiv players
FC Chornomorets-2 Odesa players
FC Naftokhimik Kremenchuk players
FC Zimbru Chișinău players
Ukrainian footballers
Ukrainian Premier League players
Ukrainian First League players
Ukrainian Second League players
Ukrainian expatriate sportspeople in Moldova
Expatriate footballers in Moldova
Ukrainian expatriate sportspeople in Kazakhstan
Expatriate footballers in Kazakhstan
Association football forwards